Sleepy Eyed is a 1995 album by Buffalo Tom. The band was looking to move away from the polished sound of their previous album in favor of a more stripped-down, live-sounding approach.

The subtitle of "Twenty-Points" namechecks The Ballad of Sexual Dependency, by Nan Goldin.

Critical reception
Trouser Press wrote: "Simultaneously grungy and clean, anthemic singalongs like 'Tangerine' and 'It’s You' do a lot to restore Buffalo Tom’s erstwhile status as everyone’s favorite raucously sincere college rockers."

Track listing 
 "Tangerine"
 "Summer"
 "Kitchen Door"
 "Rules"
 "It's You"
 "When You Discover"
 "Sunday Night"
 "Your Stripes"
 "Sparklers"
 "Clobbered"
 "Sundress"
 "Twenty-Points (The Ballad of Sexual Dependency)"
 "Souvenir"
 "Crueler"

All songs by Buffalo Tom.

Personnel 
Buffalo Tom
Bill Janovitz - vocals, guitar, piano, Hammond B-3, harmonica on track 7
Chris Colbourn - bass, cello, guitar, vocals on tracks 3 & 10 & 12, harmonica on track 3
Tom Maginnis - drums, percussion

Charts

References 

Buffalo Tom albums
1995 albums
Beggars Banquet Records albums
Albums produced by John Agnello